Adolfo Dumini or Duminy (born 11 May 1863) was an Italian painter active in Florence. He was the son of the painter Leopoldo Dumini. He painted mainly genre subjects. He also marketed antiquities and copied classic masterpieces. He emigrated to United States, but returned to Italy during World War I. His son, born in 1896 in St Louis, Missouri, was a paramilitary for the fascist regime of Mussolini.

References

1863 births
Year of death missing
19th-century Italian painters
Italian male painters
Italian genre painters
Painters from Florence
19th-century Italian male artists